Patvinsuo National Park is a national park in the North Karelia region of Finland, in the municipalities of Lieksa and Ilomantsi. The park has bogs, former managed forest and slash-and-burn areas and some old-growth forests. Suomujärvi lake is located in the northeast area in the park.

See also 
 List of national parks of Finland
 Protected areas of Finland

References

External links
 Nationalparks.fi – Patvinsuo National Park

National parks of Finland
Biosphere reserves of Finland
Geography of North Karelia
Protected areas established in 1982
Tourist attractions in North Karelia
1982 establishments in Finland
Ramsar sites in Finland